North Korea competed at the 2017 World Aquatics Championships in Budapest, Hungary.

Medalists

Diving

North Korea has entered 5 divers (two male and three female).

Men

Women

Mixed

Swimming

North Korea has received a Universality invitation from FINA to send two female swimmers to the World Championships.

Synchronized swimming

North Korea's synchronized swimming team consisted of 10 athletes (10 female).

Women

 Legend: (R) = Reserve Athlete

References

Nations at the 2017 World Aquatics Championships
North Korea at the World Aquatics Championships
2017 in North Korean sport